Facundo Martín Martínez Montagnoli (born 2 April 1985 in Buenos Aires) is an Argentine-Uruguayan footballer playing for Universidad Católica.

External links
 Player profile 
 Player statistics  
 

1985 births
Living people
Argentine footballers
Uruguayan footballers
Association football midfielders
Rampla Juniors players
Club Atlético River Plate footballers
Montevideo Wanderers F.C. players
C.D. Universidad Católica del Ecuador footballers
Argentine Primera División players
Ecuadorian Serie A players
Expatriate footballers in Ecuador
Expatriate footballers in Uruguay
Footballers from Buenos Aires